Karhu (Finnish for 'bear') may refer to:

 Karhu (beer), a Finnish beer brand
 Karhu (ship), name of the 1876 barque Lalla Rookh while under the Finnish flag, 1923/4 to 1926
 Karhu (sports brand), a Finnish sports brand
 Karhu (surname), a Finnish-language surname
 Karhu Team, a police tactical unit of the Police of Finland
 Kauhajoki Karhu Basket, a Finnish basketball team
 Karhumäki Karhu 48B, a Finnish airplane

fi:Karhu (täsmennyssivu)